The Northern Ireland men's national volleyball team is the national volleyball team of Northern Ireland. They compete in the World Championships and have qualified for Round 2 of the 2018 FIVB Volleyball Men's World Championship with Gerry Ford as head coach and Harry Gilliland as assistant coach. They also compete in the CEV European Small Nations division and qualified for the Final of the tournament to be held in 2017.

The team has training camps throughout the year. Elite level players, based in other countries, who have NI heritage, may be eligible for the team.

Current roster

References

External links
Northern Ireland Volleyball Association
Federation International du Volleyball
Confederation European Volleyball

National men's volleyball teams
Men's national sports teams of Northern Ireland
Volleyball in Northern Ireland